David Coverdale is best known for his band Whitesnake. Whitesnake emerged when Coverdale wanted to name his backing band on tour, before becoming a device for him to promote himself with though it remained his backing band and not a band in its own right. Later Coverdale would return to solo work and would also work with Jimmy Page on a project. Aside from Coverdale himself, there was a number of other overlaps in membership of these various groups.  To construct an accurate chronology of his backing band therefore, the line-ups for David Coverdale Band, Whitesnake and Coverdale-Page have been included.

Deep Purple (1973–1976) 

The first lineup of Deep Purple with David Coverdale and Glenn Hughes released two studio albums – Burn and Stormbringer, both in 1974 – before founding member Blackmore left the band, reportedly due to the new influences of funk rock presented by Coverdale and Hughes. Mark IV of the band, featuring Tommy Bolin in place of Blackmore, released their only album Come Taste the Band in 1975, before breaking up the following year.

David Coverdale backing bands - transformed into Whitesnake (1976–1978) 
Whitesnake wasn't so much formed, as evolved. It was put together during the process of David Coverdale's post-Deep Purple solo career. He began work with classic Whitesnake guitarist Micky Moody on both his solo albums. The touring band in 1978 that Coverdale used (to support his Northwinds album) was the band that would become Whitesnake very shortly.

First Whitesnake era (1978–1991) 
When reforming Whitesnake in 1982 after a brief hiatus, Coverdale brought back only Moody and Lord, and the hurriedly put together band changed as it settled. The session musicians required to complete Whitesnake's self-titled album in 1987 only played on the song Here I Go Again 87 (other than the keyboards), because this song was unfinished when the band was fired.

Coverdale embarks on Coverdale•Page collaboration (1991–1993)
When Coverdale split up the band in 1991 to work with Jimmy Page, he worked with Denny Carmassi (who had done a little session work in 1987 for Whitesnake), Guy Pratt and Brett Tuggle. Carmassi was on both the album and tour for Coverdale-Page while the other two only appeared on the tour.

Second era Whitesnake: temporary reunions (1994–1998) 
Carmassi would join Whitesnake for the 1994 Greatest Hits Reunion tour which was organised shortly after Coverdale put the new compilation together. All three would join the band in 1997 for Restless Heart (though this was initially meant to be a David Coverdale solo project, and Pratt and Tuggle left before the support tour).

David Coverdale returns to solo work and tours (1998–2002) 
Hilland, Franklin, and Carmassi all joined Coverdale for his Into the Light solo album in 2000. Earl Slick, Doug Bossi and future member Marco Mendoza also contributed.

Third era Whitesnake: 25th anniversary reformation (2002 on) 
In 2002, Whitesnake reformed fully. Unlike the reunions of the mid 1990s, this is a full-time lineup as existed previously in the late 1970s, 1980s and early 1990s.

Timeline

References

 
Coverdale, David